The New Jersey Minutemen were a militant anti-fascist group that operated in Newark, New Jersey from 1933 to 1941. They were antagonists of the pro-Nazi German-American Bund and the Christian Front group inspired by Charles Coughlin's Social Justice doctrines. The commander of the Minutemen was a former featherweight and lightweight class boxer of Jewish ancestry, Nat Arno (April 1, 1910 – August 8, 1973). The group was organized at the behest of local criminal leader Abner Zwillman. The membership consisted of "tough guys...recruited from Zwillman's Third Ward gang." According to one historian, "The mob hastened the Bund's demise by introducing mortal risks to its leadership."

The Minutemen initially attacked a meeting of Friends of New Germany with pipes wrapped in cloth or rubber; three Friends of New Germany were injured. This was followed shortly thereafter by a massive street fight outside the Schwabenhalle in Irvington, a brawl that encompassed nearly 2,000 people over 12 city blocks, 20 injuries with three hospitalizations, and seven arrests. Two men in a black sedan shot at Nat Arno and another Anti-Nazi Minutemen leader Max Feilshus on Fourth of July 1934; Feilshus was hit in both legs.

The "hoodlums" of the Minutemen coordinated with Dr. S. William Kalb of the respectable Non-Sectarian Anti-Nazi League. They had different approaches to the shared goal of disarming antisemitism and Nazism in New Jersey before World War II.

A similar program dedicated to punching Nazis was organized by Meyer Lansky in New York. Lansky's efforts—which included 1938's so-called Battle of Yorkville Casino, in which 60 Jewish-American World War I vets fought the 1,000-strong German-American Bund at a birthday party for Hitler—were partly at the behest of former U.S. Congressman Nathan Perlman and Rabbi Stephen S. Wise. Lansky put together a team for this work that included the likes of Bugsy Siegel, Lepke Buchalter, Gurrah Shapiro, Tick Tock Tannenbaum, and Blue Jaw Magoon. Lansky and Siegel declined an offer of payment for these services, considering it, rather, a duty and an honor. Lansky, who referred to the Bundists as brownshirts, later said "The main point was to teach them that Jews couldn't be kicked around."

In both states, respectable leadership involved with the campaign specified "no killing please" even though the lower-level muscle were willing to provide additional violence. Meanwhile, opposing the rise of American fascism was sound policy for criminal underground leaders whose business prospects would likely be compromised by the rise of an authoritarian regime; Mussolini, for his part, had not been a particular ally of the Sicilian Mafia.

The New Jersey Minutemen took their name from the Continental Minutemen rapid-reaction militia of the American Revolutionary War. The slogan of the New Jersey Minutemen was "No Ism But American-Ism."

Nat Arno enlisted on January 1, 1941 and served as a sergeant in the infantry of the U.S. Army during World War II. He later moved to California, started a family there and died in 1973.

See also
 Bugs and Meyer Mob
 Jewish-American organized crime
 History of the Jews in New Jersey
 Nazism in the Americas
 Operation Underworld

References

Further reading

External links
 The Jewish Boxing Blog: A Look Back at Nat Arno

1930s in the United States
1933 establishments in the United States
1941 disestablishments in the United States
Anti-fascist organizations in the United States
Jews and Judaism in New Jersey
Jewish-American organized crime
Jewish-American history
World War II resistance movements
History of Newark, New Jersey
American Mafia events
Jewish-American organized crime events